Alfons J. Schilling (20 May 1934 – 19 June 2013) was a Swiss painter.

Life 
One of the first artists to become interested in spin art. Action painting also had a large influence on his work and added to its originality. Alfons Schilling is apparently a learned follower of viennese actionism. He died in June 2013.

Exhibitions 

 Galerie Ariadne, 1975.

References

External links
 Alfons Schilling official site

1934 births
2013 deaths
20th-century Swiss painters
Swiss male painters
21st-century Swiss painters
21st-century Swiss male artists
Neurological disease deaths in Austria
Deaths from Parkinson's disease
Swiss contemporary artists
Austrian painters
Austrian male painters
Swiss photographers
Austrian photographers
20th-century Swiss male artists